United States Coast Guard Station Brant Point is located on Brant Point, in Nantucket, Massachusetts.
On November 25th, 2021, President Joe Biden visited Coast Guard members during his annual Thanksgiving trip to the island.

See also
List of military installations in Massachusetts

External links
Coast Guard Station and Brant Point Light, Nantucket

Buildings and structures in Nantucket, Massachusetts
United States Coast Guard stations
Military installations in Massachusetts
1939 establishments in Massachusetts